Calycopis is a genus of butterflies in the family Lycaenidae. Massively split up by Kurt Johnson in 1991, most modern authors consider the changes proposed at that time to be unjustified. Most of the species of this genus are found in the Neotropical realm and others in the Nearctic realm.

Species include:
 Calycopis cecrops Fabricius, 1793 – red-banded hairstreak
 Calycopis isobeon Butler & H. Druce, 1872
 Calycopis pisis (Godman & Salvin, 1887)
 Calycopis trebula (Hewitson, 1868); Trebula groundstreak

Several proposed species are of doubtful validity.

External links

"Calycopis Scudder, 1876" at Markku Savela's Lepidoptera and Some Other Life Forms

 
Eumaeini
Lycaenidae of South America
Lycaenidae genera
Taxa named by Samuel Hubbard Scudder